The Mayor of Petone officiated over the Petone Borough of New Zealand, which was administered by the Petone Borough Council. The office existed from 1882 until 1989, when Petone Borough was amalgamated into the Hutt City Council as part of the 1989 local government reforms. There were seventeen holders of the office.

History
There were two sets of mayors who were related. George Thomas London and his son, George, were both mayors. Likewise Joseph Mitchell and Lily Annie Huggan were spouses. When Joe died in 1957 his wife won the by-election to replace him as mayor. In 1968, George Gee, a Chinese-New Zealand greengrocer, was elected the mayor of Petone, the first Asian mayor in New Zealand history.

Upon amalgamation into the Hutt City Council, Petone's last mayor, Ted Woolf, stood for Mayor of Lower Hutt in 1989. He was unsuccessful but was elected a councillor for the new Harbour Ward.

List of mayors

Mayors of Petone were:

Key

†: Died in office

References

Petone
Petone